Jhunjhunu district is a district of the Indian state of Rajasthan in northern India. The city of Jhunjhunu is the district headquarters.

District location
The district falls within Shekhawati region, and is bounded on the northeast and east by Haryana state, on the southeast, south, and southwest by Sikar District, and on the northwest and north by Churu District.

Demographics

According to the 2011 census Jhunjhunu district has a population of 2,137,045, roughly equal to the nation of Namibia or the US state of New Mexico. This gives it a ranking of 214th in India (out of a total of 640). Its population growth rate over the decade 2001-2011 was  11.81%. Jhunjhunun has a sex ratio of 950 females for every 1000 males, and a literacy rate of 74.72%. 22.89% of the population live in urban areas. Scheduled Castes and Scheduled Tribes make up 16.88% and 1.95% of the population respectively.

Languages 

Shekhawati a dialect of Rajasthani, and Hindi are mainly spoken languages. The language blends into Haryanvi along the Haryana border.

Places of interest

 Kot Bandh, Kot
 Birla temple Pilani
 Fort Mahansar
 Birla Museum, Pilani
 Ramakrishna Mission in the Khetri town of the district.
 Shakambari Mata Temple, Udaipurwati
 Dhosi Hill
 Rani Sati Temple Jhunjhunu
 Chavo Dadi Temple Jhunjhunu
 Khetri Mahal
 Shree Jhujhar Ji Temple, Dhanuri
 Bhopal Garh Fort in Khetri
 Alsisar Mahal in Alsisar
 Shri Panchdeo Mandir
 Sculpture of Jujhar singh 
 Havelis in Nawalgarh 
 GogaMedi at Sotwara
 Science park in Nawalgarh
 Temple of Ramdevji in Nawalgarh (First one is in Ramdevra)
 Tibrewala and Modi Haveli
 Bissau Fort in Bissau
 Surajgarh Fort in Surajgarh
 Bissau Mahal in Jhunjhunu
 Shyamgarh Fort in Jhunjhunu
 Bishangarh Fort in Tamkor
 Gopinath Ji Mandir in Baragaon
 Mandawa Fort (Castle Mandawa) in Mandawa                           
 Desert Resort in Mandawa
 Balaji Temple in Bheemsar
 Bandhe Ka Balaji Temple in Jhunjhunu
 Dargah Hajarat Qumarudsin Shah
 Gangaur mela Bhagera
 Ashtavinayak temple
 Ghoriwara Balaji Mandir
 Havelis and forts of Mukundgarh
 Neelkanth Mahadev Temple, Bissau

Industries
Famous copper mines are situated in the Khetri tehsil of the district. The Khetri Copper Complex of Hindustan Copper Limited is situated at a distance of 10 km from the Khetri town. It is the largest copper mine in India. It also has by-products i.e. sulphuric acid, fertilizer etc.

Education
BITS Pilani
CSIR-CEERI, PILANI
Sainik School, Jhunjhunu
Jawahar Navodaya Vidyalaya,Kajra,Jhunjhunu
Jhunjhunu Academy, Jhunjhunu
Kendriya Vidyalaya, Jhunjhunu
Kendriya Vidyalaya, Indrapura
Kendriya Vidyalaya, Khetri Nagar
Sports University, Jhunjhunu
Shri Jagdish Prasad Jhabarmal Tibrewala University.
Keystone Group of Institutions, Surajgarh, Jhunjhunu
Singhania University Pacheri
Seth Motilal PG College, Jhunjhunu
Sophia School, Khetri
Birla School Pilani, Pilani
WebVidya Digital Marketing Training Institute, Nawalgarh

Notable people
Acharya Shri Mahapragya (The tenth head of the Svetambar Terapanth order of Jainism)
 Jagdeep Dhankhar, 14th Vice President of India
Birla Family
 G.D. Birla, industrialist
 Ajay Piramal, industrialist
 Karmveer Choudhary, Bollywood and television actor
 Piru Singh, an Indian Army non-commissioned officer, awarded the Param Vir Chakra (PVC), India's highest military decoration
 Kirti Kulhari, Bollywood actress
 Kulwant Khejroliya , Domestic cricketer. Only player from Jhunjhunu to play in Indian Premier League
 Salim Diwan, Bollywood actor
Chhatrapal Singh, recipient of the Sena Medal

See also
Khudania
 Jakhal

References

External links

 

Headmasterji: The Man with Literacy Mission - Sandeep Sharma - Google Books

 
Districts of Rajasthan
Districts in Jaipur division